GPS·C, short for GPS Correction, was a Differential GPS data source for most of Canada maintained by the Canadian Active Control System, part of Natural Resources Canada. When used with an appropriate receiver, GPS·C improved real-time accuracy to about 1–2 meters, from a nominal 15 m accuracy.

Real-time data was collected at fourteen permanent ground stations spread across Canada, and forwarded to the central station, "NRC1", in Ottawa for processing.

Visiting the external webpage for this service on 2011-11-04, there is only a note saying that the service had been discontinued on 2011-04-01.  There is a PDF link on that page to possible alternatives.

CDGPS
GPS·C information was broadcast Canada-wide on MSAT by the CDGPS, short for Canada-Wide DGPS Correction Service. CDGPS required a separate MSAT receiver, which output correction information in the RTCM format for input into any suitably equipped GPS receiver. The need for a separate receiver made it less cost-effective than solutions like WAAS or StarFire, which receive their correction information using the same antenna and receiver.

Shutdown 
On April 9, 2010, it was announced that the service would be discontinued by March 31, 2011.
The service was decommissioned on March 31, 2011 and finally terminated on April 1, 2011, at 9:00 EDT.

References

External links

CDGPS (Canada-Wide DGPS Correction Service)
GPS·C Distribution Using NTRIP — PDF format

Global Positioning System
Natural Resources Canada
Lists of coordinates
Satellite-based augmentation systems